Surya is a 2023 Indian Marathi-language action drama film directed by Hasnain Hyderabadwala and produced by SP Motion Pictures. Surya was released in theaters on 6 January 2023. Hemant Birje of 1985 Hindi Adventures of Tarzan will make his Marathi film debut with the film.

Plot 
Champak tries to pull off a crooked scheme with the help of Mumbai don Razak Bhai and his accomplices. But Surya's entire family dies trying to oppose them.

Cast 

 Prasad Mangesh as Surya
 Akhilendra Mishra
 Hemant Birje
 Prasad Mangesh
 Pankaj Vishnu
 Uday Tikekar
 Arun Nalawade
 Ganesh Yadav
 Pradeep Patwardhan
 Sanjivani Jadhav
 Ruchita Jadhav
 Raghuvendra Kadkol
 Deepjyoti Naik
 Hary Josh
 Pratap Borhade
 Amjad Qureshi

Soundtrack 

Music is given by Dev Chouhan and lyrics to the songs is given by Baba Chouhan, Santosh Darekar, Santosh Mishra, Dev Chouhan. Songs are recorded by Sukhwinder Singh, Raja Hasan, Adarsh Shinde, Mamta Sharma, Neha Rajpal, Kavita Nikamand and Khushboo Jain.

Release 
The film was theatrically released on 6 January 2023.

Reception 
Anub George of Entertainment Times rated the film 1.5 out of 5, finding fault with the simplistic plot, stereotyped characters and acting.

References

External links 

 

Upcoming films
2023 films
2020s Marathi-language films
Upcoming Indian films
Indian action drama films